Willam Belli (born June 30, 1982), mononymously known as Willam, is an American drag queen, actor, singer-songwriter, reality television personality, author, and YouTuber. Willam came to prominence as a contestant on the fourth season of RuPaul's Drag Race in 2012, but was disqualified in the "Frenemies" challenge.

Before appearing on Drag Race, Willam worked as an actor, most notably playing the recurring role of transgender woman Cherry Peck in Ryan Murphy's medical drama Nip/Tuck. She has continued to perform in a variety of films, television series and web series, often in drag. In 2018, she appeared in the critically acclaimed film A Star Is Born. For her performance on the dark comedy web series EastSiders, she was nominated for a Daytime Emmy Award for Outstanding Supporting Actor in a Digital Daytime Drama Series.

Since 2012, Willam has recorded three albums of comedy music, mostly consisting of parodies of popular songs. Her second album, Shartistry in Motion, debuted at number one on the Billboard Comedy Albums chart. Between 2012 and 2014, she recorded several songs as part of the group DWV (alongside drag queens Vicky Vox and Detox), including the parodies "Chow Down" and "Boy Is a Bottom", whose music videos were viral successes. Following the breakup of DWV, Willam formed another drag supergroup, the AAA Girls, with Courtney Act and Alaska Thunderfuck.

Early life
Willam Belli was born in Philadelphia. He is the younger of two children. Belli states he is of Yugoslav and Italian heritage. He lived in Florida for middle school and high school. Belli's father worked at the Kennedy Space Center. His aunt is television director Mary Lou Belli. 
 
Belli was overweight when he was young but lost the extra pounds by becoming vegetarian before being emancipated at 16. Belli met his husband Bruce, at nineteen. They were married on September 9, 2008.

Career

2000–2008: Beginnings
Belli's first acting credit was as the role of a street hustler named Bart Jaker on two episodes of The District (2002) and his first TV appearance was on an episode of the game show Street Smarts. He later appeared in the TV series Boston Public, Cold Case, The Shield, My Name Is Earl and most notably Nip/Tuck as the transgender character Cherry Peck. Throughout the 2000s he would go on to play small roles in many television shows. He also had a small role in the film American Wedding.

In 2008, Belli was featured on the single artwork for the song "Breakin' Up" by Rilo Kiley. He has also modeled as part of the Tranimal Master Class Workshop at the Machine Project, which was photographed by Austin Young.

2009–2010: Drag career

Belli is a member of the band Tranzkuntinental, which made its debut at The Roxy in 2009. The band was started by Charlie Paulson and Xander Smith and features drag queens Detox, Kelly Mantle, Rhea Litré, and Vicky Vox.

In January 2011, he was featured in Rihanna's music video "S&M" along with Detox and Morgan McMichaels as back-up dancers.

2011–2012: RuPaul's Drag Race and further success
World of Wonder contacted Willam's management asking for him to audition for the fourth season of RuPaul's Drag Race. In November 2011, Logo TV announced that Belli was among 13 contestants competing on the fourth season. Fellow castmate Chad Michaels had competed with Belli in the California Entertainer of the Year Pageant in 2010. Belli won the main challenges in the episodes "Float Your Boat" and "Frenemies", but was disqualified in the latter. In the episode "Reunited", Belli stated that his disqualification was due to conjugal visits made by his husband in his hotel room,. By Belli's own account however, in the years since airing season 4, Willam has refuted the "official story" in multiple interviews.

Belli's most recent reassertion is in an interview with YouTuber Joseph Shepherd in February 2019, where Belli claims that the 'so-called' official reason was just a fabrication by the show's creators for the purpose of portraying a more palatable scenario of Belli's departure from the show. In that interview Willam claimed that the genuine reason for his removal was due to increasing hostilities and issues between the contestants and the crew. Willam claims that many of the crew were rude and condescending towards the drag queens in general, with some of the crew members not even bothering to try to learn the contestant's names - sharing one example of a crew member repeatedly calling season 4 fellow contestant Latrice Royale - "La-something", despite all the crew having cards with the photographs of the queens/contestants (in and out of drag) worn around their necks. This led the queens to label some of the crew and their bad attitudes, plus some interactions between cast and crew, as being racist.

Willam also claimed that outside of filming hours the queens weren't being adequately fed, for example noting that $75 was all that was allocated to feed the 12 contestants, Willam claims that this necessitated visits to the store for food etc. Willam also revealed that he frequently got other contestants high and/or drunk, as well as also attempting to steal things from the set, things feather fans and RuPaul branded Iron fist shoes. According to Belli, the conjugal visit story was made up by producers and Willam agreed to "go along with the excuse" so that "everyone looked okay". Belli used the publicity of his disqualification to release his single "Chow Down", which was a parody of Wilson Phillips' "Hold On" that addressed the 2012 Chick-fil-A same-sex marriage controversy. The song featured Detox and Vicky Vox.

On March 12, 2012, he released his first single "Trouble", which was produced by RuPaul's Red Hot collaborator Tom Trujillo. The music video for the song was directed by porn director Chi Chi LaRue and premiered on Logo TV.
On March 21, Belli released "The Vagina Song", a parody of "Billionaire" by Travie McCoy featuring Bruno Mars as his third single, which had been previously uploaded to YouTube in 2010. The music video was directed by Michael Serrato, who also directed Belli's music video for "Chow Down".

Belli released "Love You Like a Big Schlong" on April 29, 2012, which became a viral hit being viewed more than a million times on YouTube alone. Produced by Uncle Slam, the song parodies "Love You Like a Love Song" by Selena Gomez & the Scene. The song was inspired by Belli's loss to 7-year-old Eden Wood in a lip syncing contest during a segment of the 2012 NewNowNext Awards.

In November 2012, Belli was featured with country music artist Drake Jensen on a cover of Tammy Wynette's "Stand by Your Man". That same month, Belli self-released his debut album The Wreckoning via his website.

2012–2013: YouTube Career, "Boy Is a Bottom", and DWV success
Beginning in December 2012, Belli began a YouTube series associated with thestylishvids titled, "Willam's Beatdown". A comedy segment involving insult humor and video reviews, the series would eventually be renewed for a second, third, fourth, fifth and sixth season that then premiered on Belli's self-titled channel. In January 2013, Belli would have his biggest viral hit with 20 million hits on YouTube alone, when he released "Boy Is a Bottom", featuring Detox and Vicky Vox, to coincide with the fifth season premiere of RuPaul's Drag Race. Its timing and the use of social media made it a very well received release. The song is a parody of "Girl on Fire" by Alicia Keys and also features an altered version of the "breakdown" from "My Lovin' (You're Never Gonna Get It)" by En Vogue. "Boy Is a Bottom" debuted at number six on Billboard'''s Comedy Digital Songs, selling 3,000 downloads in its first week.

On August 14, 2013, Belli was featured along with Shangela, Detox, Raven, Morgan McMichaels, Landon Cider, Shannel, and Courtney Act, in Lady Gaga's lyric video for her single "Applause".

Belli's trio, including Detox and Vicky Vox, called DWV, officially split in June 2014 due to a personal conflict between the members.

2014–2017: American Apparel, Shartistry in Motion, first book, perfume, and talk show
Belli then became an American Apparel Ad Girl alongside Drag Race alumni Courtney Act and Alaska Thunderfuck 5000 which they supported with a single entitled, "American Apparel Ad Girls". They also released a second single together, "Dear Santa, Bring Me a Man" for the Christmas season.

On January 13, 2017, he released a solo version of the DWV hit "Boy Is a Bottom", in Spanish, entitled, "Es Una Pasiva", which went on to top the comedy iTunes chart. Belli self-released his sophomore studio album, Shartistry in Motion, on June 2.

Belli released his first book Suck Less: Where There's a Willam, There's a Way in October 2016 through Grand Central Publishing. In 2017, he released his first perfume collaboration with Xyrena, Scented by Willam.

On May 18, 2017, it was revealed that Fullscreen had ordered a talk show to be hosted by Belli. Suck Less, billed as a weekly half-hour call-in show 'where Willam throws shade and shows how to slay the game of life in six-inch stilettos' is set to debut in the summer. Friends from Belli's everyday life, as well as some of his favorite drag queens are expected to put in guest appearances over the course of the 13-episode series.

2018–present: A Star Is Born and other ventures
In 2018, Willam appeared in the critically acclaimed film A Star Is Born. Willam and fellow drag queen Shangela play queens working in a drag bar alongside Lady Gaga's character Ally when she's discovered by famous country singer Jackson Maine, played by Bradley Cooper. Willam's character, Emerald, is a Dolly Parton impersonator who flirts with Jackson. The dialogue in his scenes was mostly improvised, including a memorable moment in which his character has Jackson autograph her silicone breastplate. Bradley Cooper, who also directed the film, said that Willam and Shangela "blew his mind" with their ad-libbing.

On July 18, 2018, the first episode of Belli's Drag Race-themed podcast co-hosted with Alaska Thunderfuck and entitled Race Chaser, was published on the Forever Dog Network. In 2020 Alaska and Willam announced that they would be setting up their own podcast network in collaboration with Forever Dog, Moguls of Media (MOM), featuring a "star-studded roster of iconic drag queens and queer luminaries" to bridge "the past, present, and future of LGBTQ+ entertainment". Podcasts established under the Moguls of Media brand and executive produced by Willam and Alaska include The Chop, hosted by Latrice Royale and Manila Luzon; Very That, hosted by Delta Work and Raja; Hi Jinkx!, hosted by Jinkx Monsoon; Famous This Week, hosted by Priyanka and formerly Brooke Lynn Hytes; Sloppy Seconds, hosted by Big Dipper and Meatball; Wanna Be On Top?, hosted by Shea Couleé; and Hall & Closet, hosted by Jaida Essence Hall and Heidi N Closet.

In 2019, Belli launched his own makeup line, Suck Less Face & Body. In June 2019, a panel of judges from New York magazine placed her ninth on their list of "the most powerful drag queens in America", a ranking of 100 former Drag Race contestants.

In 2021, Belli was announced as the star of Iconic Justice, a courtroom show in which Belli will hear and rule on various legal and social disputes between LGBTQ people.

Filmography
Film

Television

Web

Music videos

Discography

Albums

Singles

Tours
Access All Areas Tour 

Bibliography

Awards and nominations
Daytime Emmy Awards
Belli was nominated for his performance on the Netflix dark comedy web series EastSiders at the 47th Daytime Emmy Awards.

|-
|rowspan="2"| 2020
|rowspan="2"| EastSiders || Outstanding Supporting Actor in a Digital Daytime Drama Series || 
|-
|| Outstanding Makeup || 
|-

NewNowNext Awards
Belli was nominated for his role on RuPaul's Drag Race at the fifth annual NewNowNext Awards which aired on Logo network on April 9, 2012. He lost to Nadia G. of Bitchin' Kitchen which airs on the Food Network Canada and the Cooking Channel. 

|-
| 2012
| Willam Belli ||  Most Addictive Reality Star || 
|-

Queerty Awards

|-
| 2019
| rowspan="3"|Race Chaser| Podcast
| 
|-
| 2020
| Podcast
| 
|-
| 2021
| Podcast
| 
|-
| rowspan="2"|2022
| Willam Belli ||  Drag Royalty || 
|-
| Race Chaser||  Podcast || 
|-
| 2023
| Access All Areas: The AAA Girls Tour''
| Documentary
| 
|-

References

External links
 

1982 births
Living people
American bloggers
American drag queens
American male film actors
American male television actors
American gay actors
American gay musicians
LGBT people from Pennsylvania
American LGBT singers
LGBT YouTubers
Male actors from Philadelphia
Willam Belli
American YouTubers
Comedy YouTubers
American male bloggers
American podcasters
American people of Yugoslav descent
American people of Italian descent
20th-century American LGBT people
21st-century American LGBT people